Brachyarthrum is a genus of true bugs belonging to the family Miridae. It is monotypic, being represented by the single species Brachyarthrum limitatum which is found in Europe.

References

Miridae